Jean Atkinson Scott (born 15 March 1951) is a British former figure skater from Scotland. She is the 1973 European silver medalist and a two-time British national champion (1971, 1973). She placed 11th at the 1972 Winter Olympics.

Results

References

 Märkische Volksstimme (former East German newspaper) from 11 February 1973

British female single skaters
Figure skaters at the 1972 Winter Olympics
Olympic figure skaters of Great Britain
Living people
European Figure Skating Championships medalists
1951 births